Melieria ochricornis is a species of picture-winged fly in the family Ulidiidae.

References

ochricornis
Articles created by Qbugbot
Insects described in 1873